The 1966 Utah State Aggies football team was an American football team that represented Utah State University as an independent during the 1966 NCAA University Division football season. In their fourth and final season under head coach Tony Knap, the Aggies compiled a 4–6 record and outscored all opponents by a total of 181 to 163.

The team's statistical leaders included John Pappas with 535 passing yards, Eric Maughan with 574 rushing yards and 31 points scored, Dave Clark with 251 receiving yards.

Knap resigned after the season in January 1967 for an assistant coaching position with the BC Lions in the Canadian Football League (CFL). He was succeeded in February by Chuck Mills, the offensive coordinator with the Kansas City Chiefs, the champions of the American Football League (AFL).

Schedule

References

Utah State
Utah State Aggies football seasons
Utah State Aggies football